Pathtrace was founded before 1998 and remains in Reading, Berkshire, England.  Its main product is a 3-axis CAM system that specializes in production machining.

The company was bought by Planit Group, a kitchen design company, in January 2006  from its original founder.

Products
Edgecam

External links
Edgecam web site
Planit

Engineering companies of the United Kingdom